SS Negley D. Cochran was a Liberty ship built in the United States during World War II. She was named after Negley D. Cochran, an American newspaper editor and owner of The Toledo Bee newspaper.

Construction
Negley D. Cochran was laid down on 19 July 1944, under a Maritime Commission (MARCOM) contract, MC hull 2492, by the St. Johns River Shipbuilding Company, Jacksonville, Florida; she was sponsored by Mrs. Abraham Hurwitz, the wife of the editor of the Jacksonville Journal, and was launched on 29 August 1944.

History
She was allocated to the Smith & Johnson Co., on 10 September 1944. She was sold for commercial use, 6 February 1946, to States Marine Corp., for $558,923.86.

References

Bibliography

 
 
 
 
 

 

Liberty ships
Ships built in Jacksonville, Florida
1944 ships